Cryptoparachtes adzharicus is a spider species found in Georgia.

See also 
 List of Dysderidae species

References

External links 

Dysderidae
Spiders of Georgia (country)
Spiders described in 1992